Al-Aminul Karim Sultan Sallehuddin ibni Almarhum Sultan Badlishah (born 30 April 1942) is the 29th Sultan of Kedah, Malaysia. He was proclaimed Sultan on 12 September 2017, upon the death of his elder half brother, Sultan Abdul Halim Mu'adzam Shah.

Biography
Sultan Sallehuddin was born (as Tunku Mahmud Sallehuddin) and raised in  Istana Anak Bukit, Alor Setar, Kedah. He was the ninth of 14 siblings, to Sultan Badlishah, the 27th Sultan of Kedah, and Sultanah Asma, daughter of Sultan Sulaiman of Terengganu.

Sultan Sallehuddin was educated at the Alor Merah Malay School and continued his studies at the Sultan Abdul Hamid College. He graduated with a higher education from the College of Military Engineering, Poona in India.

Military career
Sultan Salehuddin's military career started when he underwent cadet training at the Indian Military Academy in Dehradun from  July 23, 1962 to  June 30, 1963.  He was appointed Junior Lieutetant on October 23, 1963. On February 12, 1964, he was commissioned as a lieutenant and stationed with the 2nd Battalion of the Royal Malay Regiment in Pengkalan Chepa, Kota Bharu, Kelantan. He was later promoted to the rank of colonel.

During his services, Sultan Sallehuddin had been involved in several security operations at the border areas with Thailand.

Tunku Temenggong of Kedah
Sultan Sallehuddin was proclaimed as Tunku Temenggong of Kedah on 28 November 1981. He became one of members of the Council of Regency when his eldest brother, Sultan Abdul Halim Mu'adzam Shah, served as the Yang di-Pertuan Agong from 2011 to 2016, and chaired that Council after the death of his elder brother, Tunku Annuar, in 2014.

Raja Muda of Kedah
Sultan Sallehuddin was proclaimed as Raja Muda of Kedah on 15 December 2016. He replaced Tunku Abdul Malik who died of natural causes on 29 November 2015 at Sultanah Bahiyah Hospital in Alor Setar.

As Raja Muda, Sultan Sallehuddin held a number of important positions including as chancellor of the Cyberjaya University College of Medical Sciences and president of the Kedah Islamic Religious Council.

Sultan of Kedah
Sultan Sallehuddin was proclaimed as the 29th Sultan of Kedah on 12 September 2017 at the Istana Anak Bukit by the Kedah Menteri Besar, Datuk Seri Ahmad Bashah Md Hanipah. He succeeded his half-brother, Sultan Abdul Halim Mu'adzam Shah, upon the latter's passing on 11 September 2017. At the age of 75, he's the oldest monarch by the age at accession in South East Asia, surpassing King Maha Vajiralongkorn of Thailand who ascended the throne 11 months before at the age of 64 (Nawaf Al-Ahmed Al-Jaber Al-Sabah of Kuwait is the oldest in the world, age 83). He's also the shortest serving heir-apparent for only 8 months 28 days before ascending to the Throne. He was officially enthroned as the Sultan on 22 October 2018 and was awarded the sobriquet Al-Aminul Karim in a televised ceremony, the first since 1959, at the Istana Anak Bukit's Balai Besar.

The event was attended by the Crown Prince of Brunei, Prince Al-Muhtadee Billah and his wife, Crown Princess Sarah, on behalf of Sultan Hassanal Bolkiah and by the then Prime Minister of Malaysia, Dr. Mahathir Mohamad, whose son, Mukhriz Mahathir, the state's current Chief Minister, read out the enthronement proclamation paper.

As per his duties as Sultan and head of the state of Kedah, he serves currently as the Colonel-in-chief of the Royal Malay Regiment.

Marriage and children
Sultan Sallehuddin and Sultanah Maliha married on 5 November 1965 and have two sons : 
His Royal Highness Tengku Sarafudin Badlishah, the current Raja Muda of Kedah (Crown Prince)
His Royal Highness Tunku Shazuddin Ariff, the current Tunku Mahkota of Kedah (Deputy Crown Prince) and second line of heir apparent

Honours

Kedah honours 

  Grand Master and Member of the Most Illustrious Royal Family Order of Kedah (DK) (2017)
  Grand Master and Member of the Most Illustrious Halimi Family Order of Kedah (DKH)
  Grand Master of the Kedah Supreme Order of Merit (DUK) 
  Grand Master of the Supreme Order of Sri Mahawangsa (DMK)
  Grand Master and Grand Commander of the Order of Loyalty to Sultan Abdul Halim Mu'adzam Shah (SHMS) - Dato' Seri DiRaja (17.7.2008) 
  Grand Master and Knight Grand Commander of the Exalted Order of the Crown of Kedah (SPMK) - Dato' Seri 
  Grand Master and Knight Grand Companion of the Order of Loyalty to the Royal House of Kedah (SSDK) - Dato' Seri (1987)
  State of Kedah Distinguished Service Star (BCK)
  Silver Jubilee Medal (15 July 1983)
  Golden Jubilee Medal (15 July 2008)

Honours of Malaysia 
  :
 Mentioned in dispatches (KPK) (1974)
  Recipient of the Order of the Crown of the Realm (DMN) (2018)
 Commander of the Order of Loyalty to the Crown of Malaysia (PSM) - Tan Sri (2011)
 Commander of the Order of Military Service of Malaysia (PGAT)
 :
  Recipient of the Royal Family Order (DK) (Al-Yunusi Star)
  Knight Grand Commander of the Order of the Crown of Kelantan (SPMK) (Al-Muhammadi Star) - Dato' (2016)
  :
 First Class (DK I) of the Most Esteemed Royal Family Order of Johor
  :
  Recipient of the Royal Family Order of Perak (DK) (2017)
  : 
  First Class of the Royal Family Order of Selangor (DK I) (2017)
  :
  Member of the Royal Family Order of Negeri Sembilan (DKNS) (2018)
 :
  Member of the Most Esteemed Order of the Gallant Prince Syed Putra Jamalullail (DK)
 :
  Member 1st class of the Family Order of the Crown of Indra of Pahang (DK I)

References

External links

Sallehuddin
Sallehuddin
1942 births
Living people
People from Alor Setar
Malaysian Muslims
Malaysian people of Malay descent
Commanders of the Order of Loyalty to the Crown of Malaysia
Sallehuddin
First Classes of Royal Family Order of Selangor
2017 establishments in Malaysia
21st-century Malaysian politicians
Recipients of the Order of the Crown of the Realm
First Classes of the Royal Family Order of Johor